Filip Björk (born 1 October 1986) is a Swedish professional ice hockey defenceman currently an unrestricted free agent who played college hockey in the NCAA for four years then signed with Bakersfield Condors, which at the time, was the NHL team Anaheim Ducks affiliate. Bjork was known for his tough playing style and mobile skating.

He signed a one-year ECHL contract with the Rapid City Rush as a free agent on 26 August 2015. However, he failed to secure a position with the Rush after attending training camp on 13 October 2015. He played professional hockey in America, 
Europe, Belarus and Kazakhstan before retiring due to a facial injury that occurred during an ice hockey game.

References

External links

1986 births
Almtuna IS players
Arystan Temirtau players
Bakersfield Condors (1998–2015) players
Beibarys Atyrau players
ETC Crimmitschau players
HK Gomel players
HK Poprad players
IF Sundsvall Hockey players
Living people
New England College alumni
New England College Pilgrims men's ice hockey
Pensacola Ice Flyers players
SHC Fassa players
Swedish ice hockey defencemen
Swedish expatriate ice hockey players in the United States
Swedish expatriate ice hockey players in Germany
Swedish expatriate sportspeople in Kazakhstan
Swedish expatriate sportspeople in Belarus
Swedish expatriate sportspeople in Slovakia
Swedish expatriate sportspeople in Italy
Swedish expatriate sportspeople in France
Expatriate ice hockey players in Kazakhstan
Expatriate ice hockey players in Belarus
Expatriate ice hockey players in Slovakia
Expatriate ice hockey players in Italy
Expatriate ice hockey players in France